Henry Wesley Zeidler (January 2, 1859 – 1951) was an architect in Muscatine, Iowa. He designed Hotel Tipton in Tipton, Iowa and Greenwood Cemetery Chapel in Muscatine, both of which are listed on the National Register of Historic Places.

His father, William Zeidler, was a builder in Muscatine for more than 30 years. Henry Zeidler's brother Charles worked with him and Henry Zeidler designed many of the buildings his father constructed.

Work
Greenwood Cemetery Chapel, 1814 Lucas in Muscatine
Hotel Tipton, 524-527 Cedar Street in Tipton, Iowa
Muscatine City Hall building (1908)
Lincoln School addition (1907)
Residences in Columbia Junction and near Letts, Iowa
2-story school (1913) in Muscatine
School in Wolton Iowa and addition to Muscatine school
Building for Samuel Batterson in Muscatine, 3-story tone and brick building
M. C. McBride home (1897) in Muscatine
Iowa Telephone Company building in Muscatine
Brick skating rink (1907) in Muscatine
County asylum and poor house (1903) in Boone, Iowa
Nichols Townsend house

References

1859 births
1951 deaths
19th-century American architects
20th-century American architects
Architects from Iowa
People from Muscatine, Iowa